Ester Ringnér-Lundgren (4 October 1907, in Norrköping – 26 July 1993) was a Swedish writer who wrote books for children and youth. A few of her books were published in Great Britain.

Biography 
Ester Maria Ringnér grew up on Tunnbindaregatan in Norrköping and was the daughter of Johanna and Birger Ringnér.  She attended the primary school in Saltängen for two years and then eight years at the Northern Girls' School in Norrköping. Already at the age of twelve, she decided to become a writer.

Publications
 Little Trulsa
 Little Trulsa's teaparty
 Little Trulsa's secret
 Little Trulsa's birthday

References

Further reading

External links

 Sällskapet för Ester Ringnér-Lundgren Swedish website
 The British Library

1907 births
1993 deaths
People from Norrköping
Writers from Östergötland
Swedish children's writers
Swedish women children's writers
20th-century Swedish women writers